The Centre hospitalier universitaire Sainte-Justine (CHU Sainte-Justine) is the largest mother and child centre in Canada and one of the four most important pediatric centres in North America. It is affiliated with the Université de Montréal, located in Montreal, Quebec, Canada.

Founded in 1907 by Justine Lacoste-Beaubien and Dr Irma Levasseur, the CHU Sainte-Justine is currently the largest pediatric health centre in Canada. With its 550 beds, of which 30 are in the intensive care unit, it receives 19,000 inpatients yearly. The centre employs 520 doctors and 4500 medical students and residents.

The CHU officially became a university health centre in 1995 and has since welcomed around 2500 medical students yearly. It has also been home to a research centre since 1973. In 2000, the Centre de réadaptation Marie-Enfant, the only pediatric rehabilitation centre in Quebec, became affiliated with the CHU Sainte-Justine.

The institution underwent a major expansion in 2018, under the project "Grandir en Santé". This extension has increased the centre's total area by 65%.

The CHU is a Level 1 pediatric trauma centre, receiving children from all over Quebec for pediatric liver transplantation, pediatric craniofacial surgery, and pediatric burn surgery. Tertiary and quaternary care in paediatrics and obstetrics includes all specialties in pediatric surgery, including cardiac, vascular and neurosurgery, as well as all pediatric specialties, including organ transplantation, oncology, hematology and child psychiatry. It is also the provincial reference centre for the detection of deafness, management of chronic pain and developmental disorders in children.

Although a mother-child institution, it does not have the medical capacity to care for those mothers who require intensive care management. As such, these mothers are required to be transferred to other institutions on the Montreal island, such as: McGill University Health Centre (MUHC), Hôpital Maisonneuve Rosemont, Jewish General Hospital or Centre hospitalier de l'Université de Montréal. Currently, the only centre on the island of Montreal with a full array of intensive-care (including fetal interventions, ECMO, dialysis, neurosurgery, care for the extreme premature newborn and cardiac surgery) for both the mother and the newborn, is the McGill University Health Centre (which is home to the Royal Victoria Hospital and the Montreal Children's Hospital).

Gallery

See also
 Centre hospitalier universitaire de Montreal (CHUM)
 Montreal Children's Hospital
 Shriners Hospital for Children – Canada, also located in Montreal

References

Hospitals in Montreal
Hospital buildings completed in 1957
Université de Montréal
Children's hospitals in Canada
Hospitals established in 1907
Côte-des-Neiges–Notre-Dame-de-Grâce
1907 establishments in Quebec